Xanax is the trade name of the drug Alprazolam.

Xanax may also refer to:

 Xanax (band), a Serbian musical group
 Xanax the Magician, a character in TV series Galavant played by Ricky Gervais
 Xanax, a song by Lindsay Lohan

See also
 Xanax 25, an American alternative rock group